RIT is a common abbreviated name for Rochester Institute of Technology in Rochester, New York, USA.

RIT or rit may also refer to:

Business
 Recherche et Industrie Thérapeutiques, the former name of what is now GlaxoSmithKline Biologicals in Belgium
 Rede Internacional de Televisão, a Brazilian religious television channel
 RiT Technologies, a company specializing in structured cabling management systems
 Rothschild Investment Trust, now RIT Capital Partners, a large British investment trust
 Rit Dye, a household clothing dye manufactured by Phoenix Brands

Education
 Rajalakshmi Institute of Technology, a college in Tamil Nadu, India
 Rajiv Gandhi Institute of Technology, Kottayam
 Rourkela Institute of Technology, Kalunga, Orissa, India
 Royal Institute of Thailand, the office of Royal Society of Thailand
 Rochester Institute of Technology, a private research university in the town of Henrietta in the Rochester, New York metropolitan area.

Medicine 
 Radioimmunotherapy, radioisotope therapy with monoclonal antibodies
 Radioisotope therapy, a form of radiation therapy
 Rit (protein), a member of the ras superfamily of proteins

Music 
 Recording Industry Foundation in Taiwan, the organization representing the music industry in Taiwan
 Rit's House, a 2002 album by Lee Ritenour
 rit., abbreviation for ritardando or ritenuto

Transit 
 Rede Integrada de Transporte, a bus rapid transit system in Curitiba, Brazil
 Riffelalp tram (RiT), a mountain tram line near Zermatt, Switzerland
 Roosevelt Island Tramway, a tram connecting Manhattan and Roosevelt Island in New York City

Other uses
 Rapid intervention team, firefighter assist and search team

See also  
 Ritt